Carolyn Bolivar-Getson (born February 10, 1964) is a Canadian politician. She represented the electoral district of Lunenburg West in the Nova Scotia House of Assembly from 2003 to 2009 as a member of the Progressive Conservatives.

Born in 1964 at Bridgewater, Nova Scotia, Bolivar-Getson graduated from Saint Mary's University with a Bachelor of Commerce degree. She owned and operated a general store in Newcombville. In 1997, she was elected as a municipal councillor in Lunenburg County.

Bolivar-Getson entered provincial politics in the 2003 election, winning the Lunenburg West riding. In August 2003, she was appointed to the Executive Council of Nova Scotia as Minister of Human Resources, Minister responsible for the Public Service Commission, and Minister responsible for the Advisory Council on the Status of Women Act. When Rodney MacDonald took over as premier in February 2006, he named Bolivar-Getson as Minister of Environment and Labour.

Following her re-election in 2006, Bolivar-Getson was shuffled to Minister of Immigration. She was given an additional role in cabinet in September 2007 when she was named the first Minister of Seniors. In October 2007, Bolivar-Getson was dropped as Minister of Immigration, retaining roles in cabinet as Minister of Human Resources, Minister of Seniors, and Minister of Emergency Management. In January 2009, Bolivar-Getson was named Minister of Natural Resources. In the 2009 election, Bolivar-Getson was defeated by New Democrat Gary Ramey.

In 2012, Bolivar-Getson returned to municipal politics, winning a council seat in the Municipality of the District of Lunenburg.

In April 2016, Bolivar-Getson announced she would run for mayor of the Municipality of the District of Lunenburg in the 2016 municipal election. On October 15, Bolivar-Getson was elected mayor, defeating Tom Lockwood by 154 votes. Bolivar-Getson was sworn in on November 1, replacing Don Downe. She was re-elected in the 2020 municipal election.

References

1964 births
Living people
Members of the Executive Council of Nova Scotia
People from Bridgewater, Nova Scotia
Progressive Conservative Association of Nova Scotia MLAs
Saint Mary's University (Halifax) alumni
Women mayors of places in Nova Scotia
Women MLAs in Nova Scotia
Women municipal councillors in Canada
Nova Scotia municipal councillors
21st-century Canadian politicians
21st-century Canadian women politicians
Mayors of places in Nova Scotia
Women government ministers of Canada